In mathematics, a convergence group or a discrete convergence group is a group  acting by homeomorphisms on a compact metrizable space  in a way that generalizes the properties of the action of Kleinian group by Möbius transformations on the ideal boundary  of the hyperbolic 3-space .
The notion of a convergence group was introduced by Gehring and Martin (1987)  and has since found wide applications in geometric topology, quasiconformal analysis, and geometric group theory.

Formal definition 

Let  be a group acting by homeomorphisms on a compact metrizable space . Note that the "poles"  associated with the subsequence   are not required  to be distinct.

Reformulation in terms of the action on distinct triples 

For a set  denote , where .

Then the following equivalence is known to hold:

Let  be a group acting by homeomorphisms on a compact metrizable space  with at least two points.

Examples 

 The action of a word-hyperbolic group  by translations on its ideal boundary  is a convergence group action.
 The action of a relatively hyperbolic group  by translations on its Bowditch boundary  is a convergence group action.

Classification of elements in convergence groups 

Let  be a group acting by homeomorphisms on a compact metrizable space with at least three points,  and let .

Moreover, for every  the elements  and have the same type.

If   is parabolic with a fixed point  then for every  one has 

Uniform convergence groups 

Conical limit points 

Let  act on a compact metrizable space  as a discrete convergence group. A point  is called a conical limit point (sometimes also called a radial limit point or  a point of approximation) if there exist an infinite sequence of distinct elements  and distinct points  such that  and for every  one has .

An important result of Tukia, also independently obtained by Bowditch, states:

Word-hyperbolic groups and their boundaries 

It was already observed by Gromov that the natural action by translations of a word-hyperbolic group  on its boundary  is a uniform convergence action (see for a formal proof). Bowditch proved an important converse, thus obtaining a topological characterization of word-hyperbolic groups:

Theorem. Let  act as a discrete uniform convergence group on a compact metrizable space  with no isolated points. Then the group  is word-hyperbolic and there exists a -equivariant homeomorphism .

Convergence actions on the circle 

An isometric action of a group  on the hyperbolic plane  is called geometric if this action is properly discontinuous and cocompact.
An important result of Tukia (1986), Gabai (1992), Casson–Jungreis (1994), and Freden (1995) shows that the converse also holds:

Theorem.

Convergence actions on the 2-sphere 

This conjecture still remains open.

Applications and further generalizations 

 Yaman gave a characterization of relatively hyperbolic groups in terms of convergence actions, generalizing Bowditch's characterization of word-hyperbolic groups as uniform convergence groups.
 One can consider more general versions of group actions with "convergence property" without the discreteness assumption.
 The most general version of the notion of Cannon–Thurston map, originally defined in the context of Kleinian and word-hyperbolic groups, can be defined and studied in the context of setting of convergence groups.

References 

Group theory
Dynamical systems
Geometric topology
Geometric group theory